Shore Lane Brook is a water course in Greater Manchester and a tributary of Ealees Brook in Littleborough.

Rivers of the Metropolitan Borough of Rochdale
Littleborough, Greater Manchester
2